Lia Paulo (born 15 April 1975) is an Angolan handball player.  

She competed at the 1996 Summer Olympics, where Angola placed 7th.

References

External links
 

1975 births
Living people

Angolan female handball players
Olympic handball players of Angola
Handball players at the 1996 Summer Olympics